Pelican Bay is the name of several places in the United States:
Pelican Bay, Florida
Pelican Bay, Texas
Pelican Bay, a bay in Anguilla
Pelican Bay, a bay in North Myrtle Beach, South Carolina
Pelican Bay State Prison, a supermax prison in California